Hohenleuben is a town in the district of Greiz, in Thuringia, Germany. It is situated 12 km northwest of Greiz, and 19 km south of Gera.

History
Within the German Empire (1871-1918), Hohenleuben was part of the Principality of Reuss-Gera.

References

Greiz (district)